Juxon is a surname. Notable people with the surname include:

William Juxon (1582–1663), English churchman
Juxon Baronets

See also
 Juxon Street, Oxford, England